The milbemycins are a group of macrolides chemically related to the avermectins and were first isolated in 1972 from Streptomyces hygroscopicus.
They are used in veterinary medicine as antiparasitic agents against worms, ticks and fleas.


Mechanism of action 
Like avermectins, milbemycins are products of fermentation by Streptomyces species. They have a similar mechanism of action, but a longer half-life than the avermectins. They open glutamate-sensitive chloride channels in neurons and myocytes of invertebrates, leading to hyperpolarisation of these cells and blocking of signal transfer.

Examples

References 

Anthelmintics
Insecticides